The 2013–14 Premier League of Belize (also known as The Belikin Cup) was the third season of the highest competitive football league in Belize, after it was founded in 2011. There were two seasons which are spread over two years, the opening (which was played towards the end of 2013) and the closing (which was played at the beginning of 2014).

Teams

Opening season

Only 6 of the 8 teams competing in the 2012–13 Premier League of Belize closing season continued to play in the opening season of 2013–14. Placencia Assassins and San Felipe Barcelona dropped out, whilst Paradise/Freedom Fighters re-entered the league, making 7 teams.

There would be one league consisting of the 7 teams, who will play each other twice, with the top 4 teams advancing to the end of season playoffs. The opening season commenced on 28 September 2013.

All 3 of the Round 5 games were postponed due to excessive rain, and were rescheduled for a later date.

Also all 3 of the Round 7 games were postponed due to the rain, and were rescheduled for a later date.

League table

Results

Round 1

Round 2

Round 3

Round 4

Round 5

Round 6

Round 7

Round 8

Round 9

Round 10

Round 11

Round 12

Round 13

Round 14

Playoffs

Semi-finals 

Game One

Game Two

Finals 

Game One

Game Two

Season statistics

Top scorers

(*) Please note playoff goals are included.

Hat tricks

 4 Player scored 4 goals

Awards
In the post-game ceremonies of the final game of the season, the individual awards were announced for the regular season.

Closing season

All 7 of the teams competing in the opening season continued to play in the closing season. The format of the league was the same as the opening season, with the top 4 teams advancing to the end of season playoffs.

The closing season was expected to commence on 22 February 2014, however this was delayed due to concerns from the 7 teams. The league was subsequently handed over to the Football Federation of Belize, and a caretaker committee was put in place to administrate the closing season. The season commenced on 8 March 2014.

League table

Results

Round 1

Round 2

Round 3

Round 4

Round 5

Round 6

Round 7

Round 8

Round 9

Round 10

Round 11

Round 12

Round 13

Round 14

Playoffs

Semi-finals 

Game One

Game Two

Finals 

Game One

Game Two

Season statistics

Top scorers

(*) Please note playoff goals are included.

Awards
In the post-game ceremonies of the final game of the season, the individual awards were announced for the regular season.

References

Top level Belizean football league seasons
1
Bel